Euchlaena deplanaria is a species of moth of the  family Geometridae. It is found in North America, where it has been recorded from Colorado to Massachusetts and south to Florida and Texas.

The wingspan is about 34 mm. Adults are on wing from February to October.

References

Moths described in 1863
Angeronini